Jennifer I. Burge (born November 29, 1970) is an American travel memoirist and speaker on global living. Her books detail her life on four continents. Burge's 2014 debut memoir, The Devil Wears Clogs, chronicles her move from Cleveland, Ohio to Heidelberg, Germany and The Netherlands. The 2015 sequel, Singapore Salvation, illustrates the reality of life as an American expatriate in Asia.

Early life 
Burge was born in Vermilion, Ohio. In 1994, Burge graduated with a Bachelor of Arts degree in Humanities from Ohio State University and moved to Scottsdale, Arizona post graduation.

Career

Technology 
Starting in 2000, Burge worked for an international consulting firm which involved travel to Canada, Germany, and Netherlands. She earned a Project Management Professional certification in 2007. That same year, she relocated to Singapore where she lived until 2011.

Writing 
Burge began contributing destination pieces to The Guide magazine in 2010. In 2011, Burge moved to Australia and became a full-time writer in late 2012. She became a full member of the Australian Society of Authors in 2013. Burge's first memoir, The Devil Wears Clogs was published in 2014. The sequel, Singapore Salvation, was published in 2015.

Bibliography 
 “Descending Into the Bay,” The Guide Magazine, August 2010
 “Street Life,” The Guide Magazine, August 2010
 "Mekong River Run," The Guide Magazine, August 2010
 "In The Emperor’s Footsteps," The Guide Magazine,  October 2010 
 “Ba Na Bliss,” The Guide Magazine, January 2011 
 The Devil Wears Clogs, (2nd edition, self published via Worldwise Publications, January 2015) , 
 Singapore Salvation, (Worldwise Publications, December 2015)

References

American travel writers
American women travel writers
1970 births
Living people
21st-century American women